Keith Urban (born 1967) is a New Zealand-Australian country singer, songwriter, and record producer. 

Keith Urban may also refer to:

 Keith Urban (1991 album), his debut studio album
 Keith Urban (1999 album), his second studio album

See also
 Keith Urbahn (fl. 2000s–2010s), literary agency founder
 Keith (given name)
 Urban (surname)